Pencraig is an area in the  community of Llangefni, Anglesey, Wales, which is 131.6 miles (211.7 km) from Cardiff and 213.4 miles (343.4 km) from London.

References

See also
List of localities in Wales by population

Villages in Anglesey